Zospeum percostulatum is a species of air-breathing land snail, a terrestrial pulmonate gastropod mollusk in the family Ellobiidae, the salt marsh snails. This species is endemic to Asturias, Spain. It is known from several limestone caves near Llanes. Though there were a few old records of Zospeum in Asturias, dubiously identified as Z. suarezi and Z. schaufussi, Zospeum percostulatum is the first species described for this autonomous community. 

Zospeum percostulatum are microscopic snails (microgastropods) with a shell height of less than 2 mm (thought relatively large for the genus), with a distinctive  surface. Live individuals has been collected on  cave walls covered by a wet film of percolated clay.

References 

 Alonso A, Prieto CE, Quiñonero-Salgado S, Rolán E (2018) A morphological gap for Iberian Zospeum filled: Zospeum percostulatum sp. n. (Gastropoda, Eupulmonata, Carychiidae) a new species from Asturias (Spain). Subterranean Biology 25: 35-48. doi:10.3897/subtbiol.25.23364.

Ellobiidae
Endemic fauna of Spain
Gastropods described in 2018

Endemic molluscs of the Iberian Peninsula